Seán Murray (1932 – 17 July 2012) was an Irish Gaelic footballer who played for club side Skerries Harps and at inter-county level with the Dublin senior football team.

Career

Murray first came to prominence with the Skerries Harps club that secured senior status after winning the junior title in 1953 and the intermediate title in 1954. He first appeared on the inter-county scene as a member of the Dublin junior team that secured the Leinster Junior Championship title in 1955. Murray made his senior debut in a tournament game the following year and had his most successful season in 1958 when he claimed National League and Leinster Championship titles. He also lined out at midfield in the 1958 All-Ireland final defeat of Derry. Two years later, Murray collected an All-Ireland title with the Dublin junior team.

Honours

Skerries Harps
Dublin Intermediate Football Championship: 1954
Dublin Junior Football Championship: 1953

Dublin
All-Ireland Senior Football Championship: 1958
Leinster Senior Football Championship: 1958
National Football League: 1957-58
All-Ireland Junior Football Championship: 1960
Leinster Junior Football Championship: 1955, 1960

References

1932 births
2012 deaths
Skerries Harps Gaelic footballers
Dublin inter-county Gaelic footballers
People from Skerries, Dublin
Sportspeople from Fingal